John O'Keeffe (1925 – 2 February 2021) was an Irish Gaelic footballer who played for club side Millstreet and at inter-county level with the Cork senior football team.

Career

O'Keeffe first came to Gaelic football prominence with the Millstreet club. He was club captain in 1948 when Millstreet defeated St. Vincent's to claim their only County Championship title. This success saw O'Keeffe drafted onto the Cork senior team the following year, and he was also appointed team captain. He won his only Munster Championship title that year.

Death

O'Keeffe died in Newmarket, County Cork on 2 February 2021.

Honours

Millstreet
Cork Senior Football Championship: 1948 (c)

Cork
Munster Senior Football Championship: 1949 (c)

References

1925 births
2021 deaths
Millstreet Gaelic footballers
Cork inter-county Gaelic footballers